David Walker (born 10 June 1932) is a British rower. He competed in the men's coxed pair event at the 1948 Summer Olympics.

References

1932 births
Living people
British male rowers
Olympic rowers of Great Britain
Rowers at the 1948 Summer Olympics
Place of birth missing (living people)